Schooled is an American television sitcom and a direct spin-off to The Goldbergs. It was ordered by ABC with Tim Meadows, Bryan Callen and AJ Michalka in the main cast. The concept aired as a backdoor pilot on a January 24, 2018, episode of The Goldbergs called "The Goldbergs: 1990-Something". The series premiered on January 9, 2019, as a mid-season replacement. In May 2019, ABC renewed the series for a second season, which premiered on September 25, 2019. In May 2020, the series was canceled after two seasons.

Premise
In the 1990s, Lainey Lewis returns to Jenkintown, Pennsylvania from the West Coast, having seen her dreams of rock 'n roll stardom fizzle out. As fate would have it, her alma mater William Penn Academy has recently lost its music teacher and Lainey reluctantly accepts an offer to take over the job. While Rick Mellor is still the school's gym teacher and coach, John Glascott has just become the new principal after Earl Ball has moved on to a school board position. While finding her way, Lainey alternately butts heads with and receives advice from another young teacher, C.B. In season 2, Wilma Howell is hired to be the school's new biology teacher.

Cast and characters

Main
AJ Michalka as Lainey Lewis (Michalka also provides the voice-over narration for each episode)
Tim Meadows as Principal John (Andre) Glascott
Bryan Callen as Coach Rick Mellor
Brett Dier as Charlie "C.B." Brown
Haneefah Wood as Wilma Howell (season 2)

Recurring

Faculty and Staff:
Lennon Parham as Liz Flemming
Stephen Tobolowsky as Earl Ball
Clancy Brown as Mr. Crosby
Alphonso McAuley as Coop
Ana Gasteyer as Susan Cinoman
Greg Proops as Mr. Granger
Tom Waters as Mr. Thomas
Stephanie McVay as Petra
Sean Marquette as Johnny Atkins
Valerie Azlynn as  Nurse Julie (Coach Rick's girlfriend)

Students:
Rachel Crow as Felicia, Glascott's niece
Christian Gehring as Roxborough Ronnie
Israel Johnson as Ed
Dallas Edwards as Aaron
Jeffrey Cade Ross Brown as Tom Scott
Gabe Gibbs as Weasel
Sofie Landsman as Jessica
Abi Brittle as Becky
Connor Cain as Bobby Maloney
Bradley Steven Perry as Alec Raday
Haley Tju as Marni
Unicorn Rose as Veronica
Mason McNulty as Toby Murphy
Thomas Barbusca as Alex Piper

Special guests
Troy Gentile as Dr. Barry Goldberg
Wendi McLendon-Covey as Beverly Goldberg
Hayley Orrantia as Erica Goldberg
Karan Brar as Reza Alavi
Bill Goldberg as Nick Mellor

Episodes

Season 1 (2019)

Season 2 (2019–20)

Production

Original concept
In November 2016, it was first reported that ABC was developing a spin-off that would center around recurring character Rick Mellor, played by Bryan Callen. On January 10, 2017, Wendi McClendon-Covey's character was reported as appearing in the script in a guest appearance. The script was ordered to pilot on February 2, 2017.

On March 16, 2017, it was confirmed that Nia Long had been cast as the female lead in the role of Lucy Winston. At the same time it was confirmed that Tim Meadows would reprise his recurring role from The Goldbergs as Andre Glascott. Jay Chandrasekhar was also confirmed to direct.

On May 17, 2017, ABC passed on the spin-off, despite it reportedly testing very well - going as far to test better than the pilot of the original series. At the same time, Adam F. Goldberg revealed the title of the failed spin-off - "Schooled".

On January 8, 2018, it was announced that the pilot would air as a special episode of The Goldbergs on January 24, 2018, under the episode title "The Goldbergs: 1990-Something". Along with Nia Long as Lucy Winston and Tim Meadows as teacher-turned-principal Andre Glascott (who is also revealed to be Lucy's brother), the pilot also starred Rachel Crow as Lucy's rebellious teenage daughter Felicia, and Summer Parker as Felicia's bubbly younger sister Gigi, with Octavia Spencer narrating as the present-day Felicia.

Development
After the pilot aired, Goldberg had expressed hope that the airing would prompt discussions with ABC that could lead to the series being picked up for the 2018–19 TV season. Three months later, on April 16, 2018, it was announced that ABC had officially picked up the spin-off, Schooled, for a 13-episode season slated to air in 2019. It was also announced that AJ Michalka would reprise her role as Lainey Lewis from The Goldbergs in the new show, but Nia Long will not return to the spin-off due to being a regular cast member on the CBS drama series NCIS: Los Angeles. Rachel Crow's Felicia is the only new character from the original pilot to appear in the series, albeit in a reduced recurring capacity.

On October 3, 2018, it was announced by Deadline that Jane the Virgin actor Brett Dier would have a series regular role as C.B., a teacher who is both a friend and rival to rookie teacher Lainey Lewis. C.B. is also based on Adam Goldberg's favorite teacher and friend.

On November 28, 2018, it was revealed that the series would premiere on January 9, 2019.

On May 11, 2019, the series was renewed for a second season. For season 2, Kali Hawk was cast in the new role of biology teacher Wilma Howell, but Hawk was later replaced by Haneefah Wood.

In March 2020, production on the series was halted due to the COVID-19 pandemic. The episode that was in production at the time was planned to air as the 21st episode of the second season, which would have covered the breakup of Barry and Lainey. The episode that eventually aired as the 21st episode, but was planned to air as the 22nd episode, had been filmed prior as a result of working around Troy Gentile's schedule with filming The Goldbergs – which was also still in production at the time. Despite not being able to complete the intended 21st episode, the completed following episode still aired as the second-season finale, with details of the breakup being provided via narration by AJ Michalka (in character as Lainey) on top of previously filmed stock footage of the characters. On May 21, 2020, ABC canceled the series after two seasons, making episode 21 of season 2 the series finale.

Reception

Critical response
The series holds an approval rating of 73% based on 11 reviews, with an average rating of 5.92/10 on Rotten Tomatoes. The website's critical consensus reads, "Schooled freshman outing struggles to differentiate itself from its predecessor—though its sweetly silly sensibilities and stellar cast may be enough for viewers looking for a good-natured sitcom." Metacritic, which uses a weighted average, assigned the series a score of 56 out of 100 based on 7 critics.

Ratings

Season 1

Season 2

References

External links

2010s American single-camera sitcoms
2020s American single-camera sitcoms
2010s American school television series
2020s American school television series
2010s American workplace comedy television series
2020s American workplace comedy television series
2019 American television series debuts
2020 American television series endings
American Broadcasting Company original programming
American television spin-offs
English-language television shows
Jenkintown, Pennsylvania
Television productions cancelled due to the COVID-19 pandemic
Television series about educators
Television series by ABC Studios
Television series by Sony Pictures Television
Television series set in the 1990s
Television shows set in Pennsylvania
The Goldbergs (2013 TV series)